Seruvalsar Lake  (also spelled Sirolsar Lake or Serol Sar Lake) is a high altitude lake in the Seraj Valley of the Kullu district, Himachal Pradesh, India. Seruvalsar Lake is accessible via Jalori pass.

History 
Locals associate the lake with Buddhi Nagin (goddess of snakes and ghee and mother of all nag deities) and claim the lake's water possess medicinal properties. A small temple to Buddhi Nagin overlooks the lake from its North side.

References

External links
 Himachal Pradesh Tourism Department

Lakes of Himachal Pradesh
Geography of Kullu district